Metaratings.ru also known as Metaratings is a sports media about bookmakers, sports betting and tips in both English and Russian, with a dedicated team based in Moscow, Russia. Golden Web Award 2020.

History 
Online since December 24, 2018. Editor-in-chief: Sergey Bregovsky. Regional versions: Belarus, Russia (metaratings.ru), United States, Tajikistan, Uzbekistan, Ukraine (meta-ratings.com.ua).

They specialize in football, ice hockey, and esports. According to a study conducted by the leader in media monitoring and analysis Medialogia, Metaratings ranks 10th in the top 20 most quoted media in the sports industry in 2020.

Awards 
Golden Web Award 2020  - special prize in the "Startup Web" category.

References

2018 establishments
Sports betting
Bookmakers